is the 29th single by Japanese entertainer Miho Nakayama. Written by Nakayama and KNACK, the single was released on June 8, 1994, by King Records.

Background and release
"Sea Paradise (OL no Hanran)" was Nakayama's only single to be issued in CD+G format, allowing on-screen lyrics to be displayed on karaoke machines and some CD-ROM-based devices. On live TV performances of the song, Nakayama wore a pink office lady outfit.

"Sea Paradise (OL no Hanran)" peaked at No. 9 on Oricon's weekly singles chart. It sold over 154,000 copies and was certified Gold by the RIAJ.

Track listing
All lyrics are written by Miho Nakayama; all music is arranged by ATOM.

Charts

Certification

References

External links

1994 singles
1994 songs
Japanese-language songs
Miho Nakayama songs
King Records (Japan) singles